Brohan is a French surname. Notable people with the surname include:

 Jimmy Brohan (born 1935), Irish sportsperson
 Augustine Brohan (1824–1893), French actress
 Augustine Susanne Brohan (1807–1887), French actress
 Émilie Madeleine Brohan (1833–1900), French actress

See also
 Bröhan Museum